The  basketball tournament at the 2011 Southeast Asian Games took place from 14 to 20 November 2011.  This edition of the tournament featured both men's and women's tournament.  All matches took place at Kelapa Gading Sports Mall in Jakarta.

Men's tournament 
All times are Western Indonesian Time (WIB) – UTC+7.

The Philippines, which sent an all-amateur team, topped Group A by beating Thailand 103–69 to give the Thais their first loss in the tournament, although both teams qualified to the semifinals. On Group B, hosts Indonesia eliminated Singapore from contention by five points, to top the group. In the semifinals, Malaysia trailed by three points at halftime, but the Philippines pulled away at the second half to secure a berth for the gold medal game. In the other semifinal, Thailand outscored Indonesia 22–10 in the fourth quarter to eliminate the hosts from the tournament, giving the Indonesians their first loss.

The Philippines won the gold medal without losing a game, beating Thailand in the final, 85–57.

Group stage

Group A

Group B

Knockout stage

7th place play-off

5th place play-off

Semi-finals

Bronze medal match

Gold medal match

Women's tournament 
All times are Western Indonesian Time (WIB) – UTC+7.

Medal summary

Medal tally

Medalists

Men's tournament

Women's tournament

References 

basketball
2011
International basketball competitions hosted by Indonesia
2011–12 in Asian basketball
2011–12 in Philippine basketball
2011–12 in Malaysian basketball
2011–12 in Indonesian basketball
2011–12 in Singaporean basketball
2011–12 in Thai basketball
2011–12 in Vietnamese basketball
2011 in Cambodian sport
2011 in Burmese sport